Entelecara acuminata is a species of dwarf spider in the family Linyphiidae. It is found in the United States, Europe, Russia (Sibiria), and Central Asia.

References

Linyphiidae
Articles created by Qbugbot
Spiders described in 1834